Castle Craig, located on East Peak in the Hanging Hills, is constructed of trap rock and is  in height and has a base  in circumference . A metal interior stairway is used to ascend the observation deck on top.

Origin and details

Castle Craig, dedicated October 29, 1900 and given to the people of Meriden, Connecticut by Walter Hubbard  is part of the  Hubbard Park named after Hubbard. There are hiking trails to the tower (most notably the  Metacomet Trail) as well as Reservoir Road which is open for vehicular traffic from May 1 to October 31 – 10 AM to 4:45 PM. Walkers and joggers are allowed use of this road 365 days of the year during normal park operating hours which is basically sunrise to sunset. From the top of the observation tower,  elevation, it is possible to see New Haven and Long Island Sound  to the south.  To the west, the foothills of the Berkshires are visible; to the north, the Hartford skyline as well as the summit of Mount Tom in Massachusetts.

The inspiration for the tower's design has been disputed for years.  Some say Walter Hubbard, a world traveler, was inspired by a Norman French tower; others by a 12th Century Turkish tower on the Danube; still others maintain that it was patterned upon an ancient tower in Craigellachie, Scotland.

Dedication of Tower 

On October 29, 1900 dedicatory exercises were held at which Mr. Hubbard formally presented the Tower to the City of Meriden.   According to a local newspaper,

Plaque

A plaque at the bottom of the tower reads as follows:

Although the plaque indicates that East Peak is "the highest point within  of the coast from Maine to Florida," West Peak, just  to the west, at 1,024 feet (312 m), is higher than both East Peak and the tower. Both East and West Peak are lower than a number of mountains in the Downeast coastal region of Maine.

References

Image of the Plaque Livejournal.com
DeLorme Topo 6.0. Mapping software. DeLorme, Yarmouth, Maine. 
Visitnewhaven.com, PDF brochure of Hubbard Park. Cited December 13, 2007.

Castles in Connecticut
Landmarks in Connecticut
Buildings and structures in Meriden, Connecticut
Tourist attractions in New Haven County, Connecticut
Hanging Hills